Chaman Railway Station is located in Chaman city, Killa Abdullah District, in the northern part of the Balochistan province of Pakistan. It lies on the border with the Kandahar Province of Afghanistan. The station serves as the terminus of the Rohri-Chaman Railway Line.

See also
 List of railway stations in Pakistan
 Pakistan Railways

References

Railway stations in Qila Abdullah District
Railway stations on Rohri–Chaman Railway Line